Christoffer "Kid" Andersen (born 15 January 1980) is a blues guitarist from Herre, Norway.

By age 11, Andersen had gained the attention of Norwegian blues guitar teacher, Morten Omlid, who steered him towards traditional blues music.  In 2001, at age 21, Andersen moved to the United States, joined blues frontman Terry Hanck's band, and quickly became a figure on the West Coast blues scene.

Andersen later played in Charlie Musselwhite's band and got a Blues Music Award (formerly W.C. Handy Award) for best contemporary blues album for Charlie Musselwhite's Delta Hardware.  Then, when Little Charlie Baty retired from touring, Andersen took his place as guitarist in the Nightcats, and the new name of Rick Estrin & The Nightcats was formed. Andersen has also done extensive touring with Elvin Bishop on the Red Dog Speaks Tour. He is married to American Idol contestant Lisa Leuschner. They currently reside in San Jose, California where Andersen is CEO of Greaseland Studios.

In 2013, Andersen was nominated for a Blues Music Award in the 'Gibson Guitar' category. In 2014, 2015, and 2016 he was nominated for a Blues Music Award in the 'Best Instrumentalist – Guitar' category.

In recent years, Andersen has gained a reputation of record producer using his own recording facility "Greaseland". He produced the last two albums of Rick Estrin & The Nightcats: One Wrong Turn (2012) and Groovin' in Greaseland (2017). In 2017, he also produced several albums including Stompin' Ground from Tommy Castro. In 2019 he co-produced Junior Watson's, album “Nothin' to it But to Do It” (which features his wife Lisa Leuschner Andersen on lead vocals.)

Discography
 Rock Awhile (2003)
 Guitarmageddon (2004)
 Greaseland (2006)
 The Dreamer (2007)

References

1980 births
Living people
Norwegian blues guitarists
People from Telemark
21st-century Norwegian guitarists